Luis Razo (born 25 September 1940) is a Mexican equestrian. He competed in two events at the 1976 Summer Olympics.

References

1940 births
Living people
Mexican male equestrians
Olympic equestrians of Mexico
Equestrians at the 1976 Summer Olympics
Pan American Games medalists in equestrian
Pan American Games silver medalists for Mexico
Equestrians at the 1975 Pan American Games
Place of birth missing (living people)
Medalists at the 1975 Pan American Games